Sophie Montel (born 22 November 1969 in Montbéliard) is a French politician.

Member of the Franche-Comté Regional Council and later regional council of Bourgogne-Franche-Comté since 1998. 

She contested the 2018 Territoire de Belfort's 1st constituency by-election, but came in 8th place in the first round.

In 2014, she was elected to the European Parliament.

References

External links 
Page on the Association des régions de France
Page on Franche-Comté Regional Council
Sophie Montel on the National Front website

1969 births
Living people
People from Montbéliard
Franche-Comté Regional Councillors
Women in Franche-Comté politics
National Rally (France) MEPs
MEPs for East France 2014–2019
21st-century women MEPs for France
Regional councillors of Bourgogne-Franche-Comté